Sharifa Fadel ( 27 September 1938 – 5 March 2023), stage name of Tawfika Mahmud Ahmed Nada , was an Egyptian singer and actress.

Life and career 
Born in Cairo, the granddaughter of qāriʾ Ahmed Nada Fadel, Sharifa Fadel started her career as a child, appearing in a radio program for children and in several films starting from 1947. Trained since childhood in music and religious chanting, she studied at the Cairo Institute of Dramatic Arts. 

Among the most popular Egyptian singers between the 1950s and the 1980s, Fadel made her professional debut recording "Amanat Ma Tshahrni Ya Bakra" by composer Mohamed Al-Moji.  Her hits include "Tamm El-Badr Badry", "Haret El-Sakayeen", composed by her longtime collaborator Mounir Murad, and "Om El-Batal", a 1973 song in honor of his son, who had died in the Yom Kippur War. As an actress, she appeared in about 20 films and also worked on stage and in radio. She retired in the early 1990s. Fadel died on 5 March 2023, at the age of 85.

References

External links
 
 

1938 births
2023 deaths 
Egyptian women singers
Egyptian film actresses
Egyptian stage actresses
People from Cairo